This is a list of Honorary Fellows of Exeter College, Oxford. A list of current honorary fellows is published on the college's website at List of Honorary Fellows.

 Martin Amis
 Sir Ronald Arculus
 Sir John Ashworth
 Pierre Audi
 Sir Roger Bannister
 Alan Bennett
 Alfred Blunt
 Alfred Brendel
 Sydney Brenner
 Sir Richard Buxton
 Dame Frances Cairncross
 Reeta Chakrabarti
 Dick Celeste
 Geoffrey Cheshire
 Sir Ronald Cohen
 Sir Ivor Crewe
 Thomas Cromwell
 Salvador de Madariaga
 John Drury
 Sir John Eccles
 Lewis Richard Farnell
 Timothy Garton Ash
 Sir James Gowans
 Stephen Green, Baron Green of Hurstpierpoint
 Kenneth Hayne
 Sir Cyril Hinshelwood
 Mark Houghton-Berry
 Sir Sydney Kentridge
 Pedro Pablo Kuczynski
 John Kufuor
 Sir John Laws
 John Leighfield
 Anthony Low
 Sir Colin Maiden
 Richard Mahoney
 Helen Marten
 James McConica
 Stephen Merrett
 Sir David Norgrove
 Joseph Nye
 Philip Seaforth James
 Sir Philip Pullman
 John Quelch
 H. J. Rose
 J.K. Rowling
 Morton O. Schapiro
 Queen Sofía of Spain
 Sir Richard Southern
 Sir Kenneth Stowe
 Stansfield Turner
 Graham Ward
 Sir David Warren
 Sir Kenneth Wheare
 David Williamson, Baron Williamson of Horton

References

List of Honorary Fellows

Fellows of Exeter College, Oxford
Exeter College
People associated with Exeter College, Oxford